Thomas Chicche (fl. 1404), of Dane John, Canterbury, Kent, was an English politician.

Family
The Chicche family had been a well-known 'gentlemanly' family in Canterbury since the 12th century. It is unknown if he married or had children.

Career
He was a Member (MP) of the Parliament of England for Canterbury in January 1404. It is unknown when he died, but he ceased being involved in the running of the city in 1408.

References

14th-century births
15th-century deaths
14th-century English people
English MPs January 1404
People from Canterbury